Glin North is the location of a National Monument in County Kerry, Ireland.

Location

Description

The national monument consists of a clochán, stone fort and cashel. The cashel (stone ringfort) covers  internally.

References

Buildings and structures in County Kerry
Tourist attractions in County Kerry
National Monuments in County Kerry